Pouteria sclerocarpa is a species of plant in the family Sapotaceae. It is found in Colombia, Ecuador, and Panama.

References

sclerocarpa
Near threatened plants
Taxonomy articles created by Polbot